Freren is a Samtgemeinde in the district Emsland in Lower Saxony, Germany. Its seat is in the town Freren.

The Samtgemeinde Freren consists of the following municipalities:

 Andervenne 
 Beesten 
 Freren
 Messingen
 Thuine

Samtgemeinden in Lower Saxony